Naughty is the second solo album by American R&B and funk singer Chaka Khan, released on Warner Bros. Records in 1980.

Biography 

Three singles were released from Naughty: the club hit "Clouds" (penned by Ashford & Simpson who also wrote Chaka's "I'm Every Woman"). "Clouds" features background vocals performed by a 16-year-old Whitney Houston and her mother Cissy Houston (US R&B #10), "Get Ready, Get Set" (#48) and the big hit "Papillon (a.k.a. Hot Butterfly)" (#22). The album track "Our Love's in Danger" featured prominent background vocals from Luther Vandross and Whitney Houston.

Chart performance 
On Billboard's charts, the album reached #6 on Black Albums, #43 on Pop Albums. Naughty garnered Khan her first American Music Award nomination for Favorite Soul/R&B Female Artist at the 8th American Music Awards in 1981.

Following the release of Naughty Khan reunited with Rufus for the recording of 1981's Camouflage. Her third solo album What Cha' Gonna Do for Me followed later that same year.

Reissue 
Naughty finally saw a United States CD re-release in 1998 as part of the Warner Bros. Black Music Ol' Skool series.

Legacy and impact 
Naughty was ranked at number 65 on The 80 Greatest Albums of 1980 by Rolling Stone.

Track listing

Personnel 

 Chaka Khan - lead vocals, backing vocals
 Anthony Jackson - bass guitar track 1, 3, 4, 6, 7, 10
 Jeff Mironov – guitar track 1, 3, 7, 9, 10
 Hamish Stuart – guitar track 1, 2, 3, 4, 5, 6, 9 
 Phil Upchurch – guitar track 7, 10
 Steve Khan – guitar track 2, 4
 Steve Ferrone - drums
 Ken Bichel – synthesizer track 2, 4, 5, 6, 8, 9
 Arthur Jenkins - percussion track 1, 2, 3, 9, 10 clavinet track 5, 6, electric piano track 7, 8
 Leon Pendarvis - piano track 1, 10 electric piano track 3, 4, 5, 6, 7 synthesizer track 4, 8
 Peter Gordon - French horn track 3, 8
 John Trevor Clark - French horn track 3, 8
 Michael Brecker - tenor saxophone track 4, 5, 7, 10
 Harvey Estrin - tenor saxophone track 9, alto saxophone track 10
 David Tofani - alto saxophone track 5
 Eddie Daniels - alto saxophone track 7, 9, tenor saxophone track 10
 Lewis Delgatto - baritone saxophone track 5, 7
 Ronnie Cuber - baritone saxophone track 9, 10
 Randy Brecker – trumpet track 5, 7, 9, 10
 Marvin Stamm – trumpet track 7
 Barry Rogers – trombone track 5, 7
 James E. Pugh – trombone track 9, 10
Alan Shulman, Alfred Brown, Anahid Ajemian, Fred Zlotkin, Frederick Buldini, Gerald Tarack, Harold Kohon, Harry Lookofsky, Homer Mensch, Jonathan Abramowitz, Kermit Moore, Leo Kahn, Lewis Eley, Marilyn Wright, Matthew Raimondi, Mitsue Takayama, Paul Gershman, Peter Dimitriades, Richard Maximoff, Ted Hoyle - strings
 Gene Orloff – concertmaster

Track 1 “Clouds”
Backing Vocals – Chaka Khan, Charlotte Crossley, Cissy Houston, Mark Stevens, Whitney Houston

Track 2 “Get Ready, Get Set”
Backing Vocals – Chaka Khan, Mark Stevens
Bass – Willie Weeks
Electric Piano – Don Grolnick
Guitar – Steve Khan
Guitar, Soloist – Hiram Bullock

Track 3 "Move Me No Mountain"
Backing Vocals – Chaka Khan, Cissy Houston
Guitar, Sitar, Soloist – Jeff Mironov
Guitar, Soloist – Phil Upchurch
Tuba – Robert Stewart, David Bargeron, Howard Johnson, Joseph Daley

Track 4 “Nothing's Gonna Take You Away”
Backing Vocals – Luther Vandross, Mark Stevens, Hamish Stuart
Guitar – Steve Khan
Percussion – Sammy Figueroa

Track 5 “So Naughty”
Bass – Marcus Miller

Track 6 “Too Much Love”
Bass – Mark Stevens
Guitar, Soloist – Hiram Bullock
Percussion – Naná Vasconcelos, Sammy Figueroa

Track 7 “All Night's All Right”
Violin [Electric] – Noel Pointer

Track 8 “What You Did”
Bass – Mark Stevens
Guitar – Hiram Bullock
Percussion – Sammy Figueroa
Tuba – Robert Stewart, David Bargeron, Howard Johnson, Joseph Daley

Track 9 “Papillon (Aka Hot Butterfly)”
Backing Vocals – Cissy Houston, Luther Vandross, Mark Stevens, Ullanda McCullough, Hamish Stuart
Bass – Willie Weeks
Harmonica, Soloist – Hugh McCracken
Piano – Don Grolnick
Alto Saxophone, Soloist [Alto Fill] – Eddie Daniels

Track 10 “Our Love's in Danger”
Backing Vocals – Charlotte Crossley, Cissy Houston, Hamish Stuart, Luther Vandross, Mark Stevens, Whitney Houston
Synthesizer – Richard Tee

Production 
 Arif Mardin - record producer, musical arranger (horns, strings)
 Lew Hawn - recording, mix
 Michael O'Reilly - assistant engineer
 George Marino - mastering
 Photography: Glen Wexler

References

External links 
Naughty at Discogs

1980 albums
Chaka Khan albums
Albums produced by Arif Mardin
Warner Records albums